This list of Volkswagen Group factories details the current and former manufacturing facilities operated by the automotive concern Volkswagen Group, and its subsidiaries. These include its mainstream marques of Volkswagen Passenger Cars, Audi, SEAT, Škoda and Volkswagen Commercial Vehicles, along with their premium marques of Ducati, Lamborghini, Porsche, Bentley, and Bugatti, and also includes plants of their major controlling interest in the Swedish truck-maker Scania.

The German Volkswagen Group is the largest automaker in the world as of 2015.
 , it has 136 production plants, and employs around 670,000 people around the world who produce a daily output of over 26,600 motor vehicles and related major components, for sale in over 150 countries.

Factories

Notes: In the second column of the table:- the 'factory VIN ID code', this is indicated in the 11th digit of the vehicles' 17 digit Vehicle Identification Number, and this factory code is only assigned to plants which produce actual completed vehicles. Component factories which do not produce complete vehicles do not have this factory ID code.

Former factories

Notes: In the second column of the table:- the 'factory VIN ID code', this is indicated in the 11th digit of the vehicles' 17 digit Vehicle Identification Number, and this factory code is only assigned to plants which produce actual completed vehicles. Component factories which do not produce complete vehicles do not have this factory ID code.

Gallery

See also

Volkswagen Group China
List of former automotive manufacturing plants

References

External links
Volkswagen Group 

Lists of motor vehicle assembly plants